The following is a list of awards and nominations received by American filmmaker Michael Bay. Bay has received five MTV Movie Awards: Best Movie and Best Summer Movie You Haven't Seen Yet for Transformers and Best Action Sequence for Pearl Harbor, Bad Boys II and The Rock. In 1994, Bay was honored by the Directors Guild of America with an award for Outstanding Directorial Achievement in Commercials. Bay received the ShoWest 2009 Vanguard Award for excellence in filmmaking at the confab of theater owners. In 2011 Bay was honored at the Transformers Hall of Fame for directing the Transformers live-action films.

Alliance of Women Film Journalists Award

Award of the Japanese Academy

DVD Exclusive Award

Empire Awards

Evening Standard British Film Awards

Golden Raspberry Awards

Golden Trailer Award

Huabiao Film Award

Image Award

Kid's Choice Award

MTV Movie Awards

National Movie Awards

Oklahoma Film Critics Circle Award

People's Choice Awards

Saturn Award

Scream Award

SFX Award

ShoWest Convention Award

Teen Choice Awards

References

External links
 

Michael Bay
Bay, Michael